Mathieu Bilodeau (born 27 November 1983 in Quebec City, Quebec) is a male Canadian racewalker. He competed in the 50 kilometres walk event at the 2015 World Championships in Athletics in Beijing, China. In July 2016, he was named to Canada's Olympic team for the 2016 Summer Olympics. He represented Canada at the 2020 Summer Olympics.

See also
 Canada at the 2015 World Championships in Athletics

References

External links
 
 

Canadian male racewalkers
Living people
Place of birth missing (living people)
1983 births
World Athletics Championships athletes for Canada
Athletes (track and field) at the 2016 Summer Olympics
Olympic track and field athletes of Canada
Athletes (track and field) at the 2019 Pan American Games
Pan American Games track and field athletes for Canada
Athletes (track and field) at the 2020 Summer Olympics